Haji Backpacker is a 2014 Indonesian film directed by Danial Rifki and released on 2 October 2014. The film, based on the novel of the same name by Aguk Irawan, stars Abimana Aryasatya, Dewi Sandra, Laudya Cynthia Bella, Laura Basuki, Pipik Dian Irawati, Ray Sahetapy, Dion Wiyoko, and Kenes Andari.

Cast
 Abimana Aryasatya as Mada
 Dewi Sandra as Sophia
 Laudya Cynthia Bella as Mariani/Marbel
 Laura Basuki as Su Chun
 Pipik Dian Irawati as Mada's mother
 Ray Sahetapy as Mada's father
 HB Naveen as interrogator
 Dion Wiyoko
 Kenes Andari

Filming process
This film that just do filming in five countries in Asia: China, Saudi Arabia, Thailand, India, and Iran, has now finally returned to Indonesia to continue the process of shooting at several places in the country. Many stories came when film director, Danial Rifki, was filmed in five countries.

Filming in 5 different countries is not easy, a lot of processes that must be passed. One of them is a permit filming, but it can be passed by Haji Backpacker' team.

This film hereafter heading 3 final destination: Vietnam, Tibet, and Nepal, to complete the process of shooting.

Awards and nominations

References

External links
Haji Backpacker on Facebook
Haji Backpacker on twitter
Haji Backpacker  on metrotvnews.com

Indonesian drama films